John L. Wadsworth (December 17, 1867 – July 8, 1941) was an American Major League Baseball pitcher who played for four seasons. He played for the Cleveland Spiders in 1890, the Baltimore Orioles in 1893, and the Louisville Colonels from 1894 to 1895.

References

External links

1867 births
1941 deaths
Cleveland Spiders players
Louisville Colonels players
Baltimore Orioles (NL) players
Major League Baseball pitchers
Baseball players from Ohio
19th-century baseball players
Portland Gladiators players
St. Paul Saints (Western League) players
Fort Wayne (minor league baseball) players
Atlanta Firecrackers players
Atlanta Windjammers players
Memphis Fever Germs players
Altoona Mud Turtles players
Memphis Giants players
Buffalo Bisons (minor league) players
Detroit Tigers (Western League) players
Columbus Buckeyes (minor league) players
Columbus Senators players
Omaha Omahogs players
St. Joseph Saints players
New Castle Quakers players
People from Wellington, Ohio